The 1941 New South Wales Rugby Football League premiership was the thirty-fourth season of Sydney’s top-level rugby league competition, Australia’s first. Eight teams from across the city contested the premiership during the season, which lasted from April until August, culminating in Eastern Suburbs’ loss to St. George in the grand final.

Teams
 Balmain, formed on January 23, 1908, at Balmain Town Hall
 Canterbury-Bankstown
 Eastern Suburbs, formed on January 24, 1908, at Paddington Town Hall
 Newtown, formed on January 14, 1908
 North Sydney, formed on February 7, 1908
 South Sydney, formed on January 17, 1908, at Redfern Town Hall
 St. George, formed on November 8, 1920, at Kogarah School of Arts
 Western Suburbs, formed on February 4, 1908

Ladder

Owing to the fact that three clubs were equal on points at the end of the home-and-away season, no club had the right of challenge in the finals.

Finals
Eastern Suburbs and St. George won their respective semi finals, allowing them to meet in the final.

Premiership final

In a tough encounter the Dragons won their first ever premiership in their twenty-first season in the competition. St. George captain-coach Neville Smith was knocked out after a heavy tackle early in the match. Smith recovered and scored 13 points through one try and five goals.

Along with Smith, St. George centre Gordon Hart also gave a sparkling display of free-running rugby league. Recently enlisted in the AIF, Hart had been given permission to leave barracks to participate in the finals.

In another incident Easts’ prop Jack Arnold and Saints’ lock Bill Tyquin were sent off after an almighty punch up. Tyquin, a Queensland representative who would later captain Australia, played only the 1941 war-time season in Sydney while he was stationed there on duty with the AIF.

It was to prove to be the final match in the stellar, record-setting career of Easts’ Dave Brown who at twenty-nine years of age announced his retirement at game’s end.

St. George 31 (Tries: Campbell 2, Hanson 2, Smith, Kelly, Hart. Goals: Smith 5)

defeated

Eastern Suburbs 14 (Tries: Dermond 2, Brown, Bamford. Goals: Brown 1)

Player statistics
The following statistics are as of the conclusion of Round 14.

Top 5 point scorers

Top 5 try scorers

Top 5 goal scorers

References

External links
 Rugby League Tables - Notes AFL Tables
 Rugby League Tables - Season 1941 AFL Tables
 Premiership History and Statistics RL1908
 Results: 1941-50 at rabbitohs.com.au
 1941 Final at nrlstats.com
 1941 Final at Dragons History site

Nswrfl season
New South Wales Rugby League premiership